Nina Lemesh (born May 31, 1973 in Chernihiv) is a retired Ukrainian biathlete.

In 2020, she became deputy Minister of Youth and Sports of Ukraine.

Career 
World Championships
2000 - Bronze medal on the relay
2001 - Bronze medal on the relay

References

IBU Profile

1973 births
Living people
Ukrainian female biathletes
Olympic biathletes of Ukraine
Biathletes at the 1998 Winter Olympics
Biathletes at the 2002 Winter Olympics
Biathletes at the 2006 Winter Olympics
Biathlon World Championships medalists
Sportspeople from Chernihiv